William Pineda Martinez (born May 31, 1966) is a Filipino actor who belongs to the first batch of Regal babies whose movie career was launched in the early 1980s. He initially starred in drama films, Manila by Night (1980), Bilibid Boys (1981), Tambay sa Disco (1980) until his studio paired him with Maricel Soriano in Oh My Mama (1981) and the result was a box-office success. Their tandem spawned many hits for Regal Films, mostly comedy movies that defined and cemented their Taray and Kulit loveteam. In 1984, William was given a title role in the 10th Metro Manila Film Festival with the thriller, Alapaap as a drug-crazed writer. He got best actor nominations from award-giving bodies the following year. He is also  known for his role as Ton-Ton in Bagets & Bagets 2.

Early life
William Pineda Martinez was born in Manila on May 31, 1966 to Bert Martinez, a Filipino Mestizo, and Margarita Pineda.  He is of Spanish and Filipino descent. As a young boy, William was known to have memorized commercials on television and had dreams of being an actor someday. William started as a commercial model for "Close-Up" toothpaste in 1979 and was discovered by late Talent Manager Douglas Quijano, after which he became a permanent artist under Regal Films which skyrocketed his career as the "Pambansang Pabling" or the ultimate 80's matinee idol.

Personal life
He was married to Bagets co-star Yayo Aguila from 1985 to 2010. In November 2010, he had a stroke. He is the son of Bert Martinez and Margarita Martinez, the brother of Albert Martinez, Ronnie Martinez, and Bernadette Martinez-Lim.

On June 28, 1987, Martinez was arrested in Antipolo for the illegal possession of cannabis and two traffic violations.

Filmography

Film
Manila by Night (1980) – Alex
Tambay sa Disco (1980)
Summer Love (1981)
Carnival Queen (1981)
Pabling (1981) – Berto
Boystown (1981) – Arnel
Oh, My Mama (1981)
Bihagin: Bilibid Boys (1981) – Luga
Bilibid Gays (1981) – Luga
Hindi Kita Malimot (1982) – Edwin
Galawgaw (1982) – Truman
Summer Holiday (1982)
Ito Ba ang Ating Mga Anak (1982)
No Other Love (1982)
Story of Three Loves (1982) – Brando
Mother Dear (1982) – Ake
Forgive and Forget (1982) – Dennis
I Love You, I Hate You (1983) – Bitoy
Santa Claus Is Coming to Town! (1982)
D'Godson (1983)
Parang Kailan Lang (1983)
To Mama with Love (1983) – Dodjie/Menandro
Minsan, May Isang Ina (1983)
Friends in Love (1983)
D' Godson (1983)
Bagets (1984) – Tonton
Daddy's Little Darlings (1984)
Kaya Kong Abutin ang Langit (1984) – Daryll Revilla
Teenage Marriage (1984)
Anak ni Waray vs. Anak ni Biday (1984) – Joey
Bagets 2 (1984) – Tonton
Shake, Rattle & Roll (1984) – Dodong
Alapaap (1984)
Mga Kuwento ni Lola Basyang (1985) – Mike
Gamitin Mo Ako (1985) – Mike
Inday Bote (1985) – Greggy
Bomba Arienda (1985)
Hindi Mo Ako Kayang Tapakan (1986)
Inday-Inday sa Balitaw (1986) – Cleto
The Graduates (1986)
When I Fall in Love (1986)
Payaso (1986)
Bunsong Kerubin (1987) – Larry
Jack en Poy, Hale-hale Hoy (1987)
Maria Went to Town! (1987) – Barok
Stupid Cupid (1988) – Jorge
Lesson in Love (1990)
Dino... Abangan ang Susunod Na... (1993)
Guwapings Dos (1993) – Simon
Sana'y Laging Magkapiling (1994)
Mayor Cesar Climaco (1994)
Sana Maulit Muli (1995) – Nick
Si Mario at si Goko (1995)
Mara Clara: The Movie (1996) – Gary Davis
Mano Mano (1996)
Mortal Kombat (1997)
Magic Kingdom: Ang Alamat ng Damortis (1997)
Kailan Mmatigil ang Putukan (1997)
Askal (1997)
Kung Ayaw Mo, Huwag Mo! (1998) – Mike
Ekis: Walang Takas (1999)
Sindak (1999)
Most Wanted (2000)
Cool Dudes 24/7 (2001)
Pangarap Ko ang Iibigin Ka (2003)
Umaaraw, Umuulan (2006) – William, Movie Executive
Twilight Dancers (2006)
Manila (2009)
Barako (2011)
Pintakasi (2011)
El Presidente (2012)
On the Job (2013)
Overtime (2014)
Honor Thy Father (2015)
Magtanggol (2016)
Imagine You and Me (2016)
An Educator (2017)
Petmalu (2018)
Ulan (2019)
Mia (2019)
On The Job 2: The Missing 8 (Reality Entertainment, 2021)

Television
Tadhana (GMA 7)
Sherlock Jr. (GMA 7)
FPJ's Ang Probinsyano (ABS-CBN 2)
Dear Uge (GMA 7)
Laff Camera Action (GMA 7)
Wattpad Presents (TV5)
Boys Ride Out (CNN Philippines 9)
Sabado Badoo (GMA 7)
Jasmine (TV5)
Klasrum (UNTV 37)
Madam Chairman (TV5)
ASOP: A Song Of Praise Season 2 (UNTV 37)
Basta Driver, Sweet Lover (TV5)
Tunay Na Buhay (GMA 7)
Wansapanataym (ABS-CBN 2)
Cassandra Warrior Angel (TV5)
Artista Academy (TV5) - guest judge
Protege (GMA 7) - guest judge
StarStruck (GMA 7)
Extra Challenge (GMA 7)
Sineserye Presents: Florinda (ABS-CBN 2)
Untold Stories (TV5)
5 Star Specials (TV5)
It's Showtime (ABS-CBN 2) - guest celebrity jurado
Kapitan Boom (ABS-CBN 2)
Daisy Siete (GMA 7)
Moomoo & Me (TV5)
Magpakailanman (GMA 7)
I Luv NY (GMA 7)
Love To Love (GMA 7)
Mahiwagang Baul (GMA 7)
Maynila (GMA 7)
G-Mik (ABS-CBN 2)
Haybol Rambol (GMA 7)
Mara Clara (ABS-CBN 2) - replaced from the late Eruel Tongco who died in 1996
1896 TV Series (TV5)
Noli Me Tangere (TV5)
Love Notes (TV5)
Maalaala Mo Kaya (ABS-CBN 2)
GMA Love Stories (GMA 7)
Mikee (GMA 7)
Spotlight (GMA 7)
Doon Po Sa Amin (RPN 9)
Ready Na Direk (RPN 9)
Boracay TV Series (RPN 9)
GMA True Stories (GMA 7)
GMA Telecine Specials (GMA 7)
Ready Na Direk (RPN 9)
Mga Kuwento Ni Lola Basyang (IBC 13)
Dr. Potpot & The Satellite Kid (RPN 9)
Ang Tabi Kong Mamaw (IBC 13)
Young Love Sweet Love (RPN 9)
Clubhouse 9 (RPN 9)
Lovingly Yours, Helen (GMA 7)

References

External links
 

Living people
Filipino people of American descent
Filipino people of Spanish descent
1966 births
People convicted of drug offenses
William
Filipino male film actors
Filipino male television actors
Male actors from Manila
20th-century Filipino male actors
21st-century Filipino male actors